Kutcha Edwards is an indigenous Australian singer and songwriter. He was born in Balranald, New South Wales, in 1965. A survivor of the Stolen Generations, he was removed from his parents at the age of 18 months. He is a Mutti Mutti man. He was named Indigenous Person of the Year at the 2001 NAIDOC Awards and won a Deadly for Male Artist of the Year the same year.

Edwards also contributed lyrics to a revised version of "Advance Australia Fair"-collabotaing with Judith Durham, and singing the anthem not only with her, but also in a solo version.

Edwards' music career began in 1991 as a member of Watbalimba. He later joined the band Blackfire who he was with during the 1990s. Edwards now fronts the Kutcha Edwards Band and is part of The Black Arm Band. He has appeared as a guest on the SBS TV series RocKwiz. He released his third album, Blak & Blu, produced by Craig Pilkington and featuring Jeff Lang as well as guest appearances by Dan Sultan and Rebecca Barnard among others in October 2012.

Discography

Albums

Awards and nominations

Music Victoria Awards
The Music Victoria Awards are an annual awards night celebrating Victorian music. They commenced in 2006.

! 
|-
| 2013
| Kutcha Edwards
| Best Indigenous Act
| 
|rowspan="3"| 
|-
| 2014
| Kutcha Edwards
| Best Indigenous Act
| 
|-
| 2016
| Kutcha Edwards
| Best Indigenous Act
| 
|-
| 2022
| Kutcha Edwards
| Soul, Funk, RNB & Gospel Work
| 
| 
|-
|}

References

External links
Official site

1965 births
Living people
Australian male singers
Australian songwriters
Indigenous Australian musicians
Members of the Stolen Generations